My Food Bag is a New Zealand meal kit home delivery service providing customers with ingredients and recipes to cook meals. The company is publicly-traded and was floated on the NZX and ASX on 5 March 2021.

History 
My Food Bag is New Zealand's longest-standing meal kit provider. The business was co-founded by Cecilia Robinson and her husband James Robinson, together with celebrity chef and nutritionist Nadia Lim and her husband Carlos Bagrie and Theresa Gattung.

My Food Bag was launched in Auckland, with first deliveries made in March 2013. My Food Bag expanded into the Wellington region in September 2013 and then into the South Island in November 2014.

In 2016, New Zealand private equity firm Waterman Capital invested in My Food Bag. In June 2018, co CEOs Cecilia and James Robinson moved to non-executive director roles and Kevin Bowler was appointed as CEO.

Business 

My Food Bag delivers its customers weekly boxes that contain recipes and the food ingredients needed to make their weekly dinners. Recipes are designed by My Food Bag's Development Kitchen team, and ingredients are predominantly sourced from local suppliers, with all meats and eggs being free range or free farmed.

My Food Bag has a broad range of products under the My Food Bag brand including My Family Bag, My Gourmet Bag and My Plant Based Bag to cater for different tastes and preferences.

In mid-2016, My Food Bag expanded its offering with the launch of Bargain Box and in 2017 launched Fresh Start, a new product range designed specifically for people wanting to manage their weight. In 2019 My Food Bag entered the ready-made meal market with the launch of My Food Bag MADE.

The company now delivers more than one million meals to New Zealanders each month.

Awards 
 Westpac Supreme Business Excellence Award (2017)
 TVNZ Marketing awards – Emerging Brand (2014)
 Deloitte Fast 50 – National Rising Star (2014)
 Westpac Excellence in Innovation Business Awards (2014)

References

External links 
 Official website New Zealand
 Nadia Lim's website
 Bargain Box website
 MADE website

Food and drink companies based in Auckland